Ursula "Uschi" Disl (born 15 November 1970 in Bad Tölz, West Germany) is a German former biathlete.

Career 
During her competitive career Disl was a 19-year veteran of biathlon and was a five time olympian, with two Olympic gold medals from the 4 × 7.5 km relays in 1998 and 2002. She also has four silver medals (two in 7.5 km sprint (1998 and 2002), one in 4 × 7.5 km relay (1994), and one in 3 × 7.5 km relay (1992)), and three bronze medals (two in 15 km individual, 1994 and 1998, and one in 12.5 km mass start, 2006). She also has two World Championship individual titles, both won in Hochfilzen, Austria, in March 2005, in the 7.5 km sprint and the 10 km pursuit.

Dubbed "Turbo-Disl" by the German media, she lay second in the Biathlon World Cup table at the beginning of the Olympics behind fellow country-woman Kati Wilhelm, and finished fifth in the overall standings for the 2004/05 season. She has finished second overall three times in the Biathlon World Cup (1995/96, 1996/97 and 1997/98) and has won forty World Cup races (28 single and 12 relay/team victories). This includes three wins at the Holmenkollen ski festival biathlon competition with one in 1995 (sprint) and two in 1996 (sprint, pursuit).

2006 was Disl's last Olympics and her final season.

On 18 December 2005, Disl was named "German sportswoman of the year", becoming the first biathlete awarded, and beating speed skater Anni Friesinger and discus thrower Franka Dietzsch.

Since 2012 she resides with her Swedish husband Tomas Söderberg in the region of Dalarna in Sweden, they have a daughter and a son. Like many German Nordic skiers, Disl was working in the military as a border patrol guard during her sporting career. In 2022, Disl acquired Swedish citizenship and she also speaks the Swedish language fluently to the point that she became a biathlon expert on Swedish radio. She also served as biathlon coach at the local club, including for her own children, but citing that 'them having fun was more important than results'.

Biathlon results

Olympic Games
9 medals (2 gold, 4 silver, 3 bronze)

*Pursuit was first added in 2002, mass start in 2006.

World Championships
19 medals (8 gold, 8 silver, 3 bronze)

*Team was removed as an event in 1998, and pursuit was added in 1997 with mass start being added in 1999 and the mixed relay in 2005.

World Cup

Individual victories
30 victories (9 In, 12 Sp, 7 Pu, 2 MS) 

*Results are from IBU races which include the Biathlon World Cup, Biathlon World Championships and the Winter Olympic Games.

Cross-country skiing results
All results are sourced from the International Ski Federation (FIS).

World Cup

Season standings

Team podiums
 1 podium – (1 )

See also
List of multiple Winter Olympic medalists

References

External links
 Disl's official website (in German)

1970 births
Biathletes at the 1992 Winter Olympics
Biathletes at the 1994 Winter Olympics
Biathletes at the 1998 Winter Olympics
Biathletes at the 2002 Winter Olympics
Biathletes at the 2006 Winter Olympics
German female biathletes
German female cross-country skiers
German expatriate sportspeople in Sweden
Holmenkollen Ski Festival winners
Living people
Naturalized citizens of Sweden
People from Bad Tölz
Sportspeople from Upper Bavaria
Olympic biathletes of Germany
Olympic gold medalists for Germany
Olympic silver medalists for Germany
Olympic bronze medalists for Germany
Olympic medalists in biathlon
Biathlon World Championships medalists
Medalists at the 2006 Winter Olympics
Medalists at the 2002 Winter Olympics
Medalists at the 1998 Winter Olympics
Medalists at the 1994 Winter Olympics
Medalists at the 1992 Winter Olympics
Swedish people of German descent
20th-century German women